The 1995 Norwegian Football Cup Final was the final match of the 1995 Norwegian Football Cup, the 90th season of the Norwegian Football Cup, the premier Norwegian football cup competition organized by the Football Association of Norway (NFF). The final was played at the Ullevaal Stadion in Oslo, and opposed two Tippeligaen sides Rosenborg and Brann. As the inaugural final match finished 1–1, the final was replayed seven days later at the same venue with the Rosenborg defeated Brann 3–1 to claim the Norwegian Cup for a seventh time in their history.

Matches

First match details

Replay match details

References

1995
Football Cup
Rosenborg BK matches
SK Brann matches
1990s in Oslo
Sports competitions in Oslo
October 1995 sports events in Europe
November 1995 sports events in Europe